Catherine Elizabeth Pierson (born April 27, 1948) is an American singer, lyricist, and founding member of the B-52's. She plays guitar, bass and various keyboard instruments. In the B-52s, she has performed alongside Cindy Wilson, Fred Schneider, Ricky Wilson, and Keith Strickland. In the early years, as well as being a vocalist, Pierson was the main keyboard player and performed on a keyboard bass during live shows and on many of the band's recordings, taking on a role usually filled by a bass guitar player, which differentiated the band from their contemporaries. This, along with Pierson's distinctive wide-ranging singing voice, remains a trademark of the B-52's' unique sound. Pierson has also collaborated with many other artists including The Ramones, Iggy Pop and R.E.M. Pierson possesses a soprano vocal range.

In February 2015, Pierson released her first solo album, Guitars and Microphones, featuring material co-written by Sia. She later released the non-album single "Better Not Sting The Bee", and on April 16, 2016, she released a cover of "Venus" as a single. Side B included "Radio In Bed" written by Kate and her wife Monica Coleman. Both tracks were produced by Jack White.

Early life and education
Pierson was born in Weehawken, New Jersey, and raised in Rutherford.

Pierson briefly attended Wheaton College in Wheaton, Illinois before transferring to Boston University, where she earned a journalism degree.  She then traveled around Europe for a time in the 1970's, including six months working as a barmaid in The Anson pub in Wallsend, UK before returning to the U.S. and moving to Athens, Georgia, where she lived on a farm and earned a living as a paste-up artist in the type shop of the local newspaper.

Music career
Pierson met up with the other members of what would become the B-52s while living in Athens, Georgia.  The band formed in October 1976 and played a few parties before heading to New York to play some shows.  Eventually, Pierson and the other band members began commuting between Athens and New York, playing gigs.

Personal life
From 1981 to 1996, Pierson was in a relationship with artist Tim Rollins.

In 2003, Pierson started a relationship with artist Monica Coleman.

Pierson and Coleman are the owners of Kate's Lazy Desert in Landers, California, Kate's Lazy Cabin in Woodstock, New York, New York's Catskill Mountains and Kate's Lazy Cape located on Cape Cod Mass . She operates the businesses with wife Monica Coleman, artist and designer whom she married on August 3, 2015. 

In a 2015 interview, Pierson stated that she identifies as bisexual.

Collaborations
 The Ramones, in the early 1980s on the song "Chop Suey", with Cindy Wilson and Debbie Harry; the title is available as a bonus track on the Ramones' re-release CD Pleasant Dreams.
 Pierson, Wilson and Strickland were part of the group Melon, and recorded two songs ("I Will Call You" and "Honeydew") for a Japanese TV show titled Snakeman Show. The soundtrack LP (in 1980) and CD (in 1988) were only released in Japan.
 Fred Schneider, on his Fred Schneider & the Shake Society solo album from 1984, on songs "Monster", "Summer in Hell", "I'm Gonna Haunt You" and "Boonga (The New Jersey Caveman)".
 Iggy Pop, on the 1990 Top-30 song "Candy".
 R.E.M., on the songs "Shiny Happy People" and "Me in Honey" from the 1991 album Out of Time, and "Fretless" from the 1991 soundtrack Until the End of the World.
 Matthew Sweet, on the 1989 album Earth.
 With Cindy Wilson on their cover of the McFadden & Whitehead's song "Ain't No Stoppin' Us Now", recorded for the soundtrack The Associate in 1996.
 The soundtrack for The Rugrats Movie, released in 1998 contains the track "The World Is Something New To Me" and features Pierson, Schneider and Wilson along with other artists.
 "We Are Family", a single released to raise money for the victims of the September 11 attacks, features Pierson and Schneider in the chorus and on the DVD documentation.
 Pierson sang with Jay Ungar and Molly Mason on their 2003 album Relax Your Mind, on the track "Bad Attitude".
 Junior Senior, on the song "Take My Time" from the 2005 album Hey Hey My My Yo Yo (with Cindy Wilson).
 Peter Jöback, duet on the song "Sing" from the 2009 album East Side Stories.
 David Byrne and Fatboy Slim, on the song "The Whole Man" from the 2010 album Here Lies Love.
 She was also a member of the Japanese group NiNa with Yuki Isoya and co-wrote and performed a complete album, with the hit singles "Happy Tomorrow" and "Aurora Tour". The album and singles were only released in Japan. Two songs were used as the ending theme song to the anime Arc the Lad.
 She appeared in Blondie's music video for "Mother".
 The soundtrack album Phineas and Ferb: Rockin' and Rollin''' released in September 2013 features Pierson singing: "Let's Spend Half A Day". The album is only available as a download.
 One song on Downes Braide Association's 2017 album Skyscraper Souls.

Albums

2015: Guitars and MicrophonesFilm and television
 The Rugrats Movie (1998, voice only)
 The Flintstones (1994, as "The BC-52's")
 A Matter of Degrees (1990)
 Athens, GA: Inside/Out (1987)
 One Trick Pony (1980)
 Pierson portrayed a club owner in the Flight of the Conchords episode "What Goes on Tour".
 The Adventures of Pete and Pete (1993, "What We Did on Our Summer Vacation")
 Pierson is credited alongside Fred Schneider in the Nickelodeon cartoon Rocko's Modern Life for the theme song vocals.
 Pierson, with the B-52's, appeared in an episode of the CBS soap opera Guiding Light in 1982.
 Pierson, with the B-52's, performed a parody of the song "Love Shack" titled "Glove Slap" in an episode of The Simpsons (1999, "E-I-E-I-(Annoyed Grunt)").
 Phineas and Ferb (2012): performed the song "Spend Half a Day" in the episode "Perry the Actorpus".
 Pierson appears as herself in one episode of Difficult People'' titled "36 Candles".

References

External links

1948 births
Living people
People from Rutherford, New Jersey
People from Weehawken, New Jersey
20th-century American singers
21st-century American singers
Songwriters from New Jersey
American organists
American rock keyboardists
American sopranos
American women rock singers
American new wave musicians
Women new wave singers
Bisexual women
Bisexual musicians
LGBT people from New Jersey
American LGBT singers
Singers from New Jersey
The B-52's members
Guitarists from New Jersey
Women organists
20th-century American women singers
20th-century American guitarists
21st-century American women singers
21st-century organists
21st-century American keyboardists
20th-century American women guitarists